Colias gigantea, the giant sulphur or giant northern sulfur, is a butterfly in the family Pieridae found in North America. Its range includes Alaska across Canada to the east coast and Wyoming, Montana, and Oregon.

Flight period is from June until early August. It inhabits tundra and willow bogs.

Larvae feed on Salix spp. Adults feed on flower nectar.

Subspecies
Listed alphabetically.
C. g. gigantea (Alaska, Alberta, British Columbia, Manitoba, Saskatchewan, Ontario, Yukon, Northwest Territories)
C. g. harroweri Klots, 1940 (Wyoming, Montana, Oregon)
C. g. mayi F. & R. Chermock, 1940

References

External links

gigantea
Butterflies of North America
Insects of the Arctic
Taxa named by Herman Strecker
Butterflies described in 1900